Thai Thief (also known as Thai Theep) is a 2006 Thai action comedy film, directed by Pisut Praesangeam and starring Todsaporn Rottakij and Sahatchai "Stop" Chumrum. It was distributed by RS Film and released on April 12, 2006. The film is set during World War II in Thailand.

Plot
In World War II, Japanese troops occupied Southeast Asia with the intention of making new colonies. Thailand was one country that allowed the Japanese troops to transport their weapons and gold via train.  For Kom, a well-known Thai thief, this was the perfect opportunity to commit a crime. Meanwhile, Toe, the leader of an anti-Japan movement has a plan to stop the train, but the situation becomes more difficult when Kom and Toe are forced to help a secret agent from being captured by the troops.

Cast
Sahatchai "Stop" Chumrum as Laem 18 Uan 
Sara Leigh as Seena 
Amthida Ngoencharoen as Patty 
Suthep Po-ngam as Toe 
Todsaporn Rottakij as Kom 
Somlek Sakdikul as General Sant 
Than Thanakorn as Yai Thaareu

External links
 

2006 films
Thai-language films
Pacific War films
RS Film films
Thai action comedy films
2006 action comedy films
World War II films